Dejan Rusič (born 5 December 1982) is a Slovenian former footballer who played as a striker.

He was capped four times for the Slovenia national team between 2006 in 2008.

Career statistics

International

Statistics accurate as of match played 6 February 2008

References

External links
 
 
 

1982 births
Living people
People from Brežice
Slovenian footballers
Association football forwards
NK Krško players
NK Celje players
Slovenian expatriate footballers
Slovenian PrvaLiga players
FC Politehnica Timișoara players
PFC Spartak Nalchik players
Expatriate footballers in Romania
Slovenian expatriate sportspeople in Romania
Expatriate footballers in Russia
Slovenian expatriate sportspeople in Russia
Liga I players
Russian Premier League players
Al-Taawoun FC players
Expatriate footballers in Saudi Arabia
Khazar Lankaran FK players
Expatriate footballers in Azerbaijan
Slovenian expatriate sportspeople in Azerbaijan
Slovenia international footballers